]
]

Prateeksha Kashi is an Indian Kuchipudi dancer, a classical dance form of Andhra Pradesh, India. She is from the family of Dr. Gubbi Veeranna and was initiated to dance at the age of five. Ever since she has been trained in Kuchipudi, under the guidance of her mother and Guru Smt. Vyjayanthi Kashi, who is a noted kuchipudi dancer, a celebrated performer and choreographer, and artistic director of the Shambhavi School of Dance. Vyjayanthi Kashi is also the present chairperson of Karnataka Sangeetha Nritya Academy.

Kashi earned her Computer Science Engineer degree from BMS College of Engineering, Bangalore. With a keen interest in spreading Kuchipudi and to inspire the youth towards it, she teaches aspiring dancers in Bangalore.

In an interview to KnowYourStar, Prateeksha Kashi was quoted saying how technology has benefited the art-"In a way the tech side of me is still very relevant and comes a long way in my career as a dancer. I feel it is very important to be tech savvy and leverage the potential that technology offers; may it be to reach out wider, learn, or even implement ideas to enhance the quality of performance in terms of music, lighting, media and more. Tech revolution in India has always favoured art!".

Life and career

Prateeksha Kashi, was born in Bangalore, Karnataka, India to an artistic family. She is the daughter of the Kuchipudi dancer, Vyjayanthi Kashi. and Vijaya Kashi, who is a television and theatre artist.

As a child, it is said that Kashi sang and danced the whole of the dance drama AMBE from the Mahabharata when she was just three years old. In fact, her stage debut at the age of five occurred when she ran onto the stage when her mother was performing at the Ramana Maharshi's Institute and started dancing in synchrony with the senior dancers of Shambhavi School of Dance next to whom she was only knee high. Since then, she has been trained in Kuchipudi under the guidance of her mother and Guru Smt. Vyjayanthi Kashi. At the age of thirteen, Prateeksha topped the state in the Kuchipudi dance exams with a distinction. Prateeksha Kashi Excelled in her studies as well. She got a gold medal for securing top rank in computer science in her Engineering College.

Prateeksha Kashi did her Rangapooja on 20 February 2009, and since then she has been recognized as the "Rising Star".

]

Notable performances

Prateeksha Kashi performed in many Indian dance festivals including

 Unbound Beats of India-New Delhi
 Ananya-New Delhi 
 Rain Drops -Mumbai
 Jayasmriti-Mumbai
 Ankur Utsav-Kolkatta
 Dover's Lane-Kolkatta
 Konark Utsav-Orissa
 Devdasi-Orissa
 Natarani-Ahmedabad
 Dharani Utsav-Cochin
 Kinkini Mahotsav-Bangalore

 Mysore Dasara Utsav-Mysore 
 Antarjatika Nrutya Sangeet Samaroha 2012, Cuttack
 Prativa Festival, Kolkata
 Tanisha Yuva Utsav, Kuchipudi, Andhra Pradesh
 MAHA MAAYA, Ravindra Kalakshetra, Bangalore.
 Rasa Sanje, ADA Rangamandira, Bangalore
 Nrityabharath Dance Festival, Ravindra Kalakshetra, Bangalore
 Kalabharathi National Young Dance Fest 2013, Thrissur, Kerala 
 World Dance Day 2013 in Alliance Francaise, Bangalore
 World Dance Day 2013 in Krishna Gana Sabha, Chennai
 Summer Festival 2013, Coonor, Ooty, Tamil Nadu
 Kuchipudi Recital in Brihadeeswara Temple 2013, Tanjavur, Tamil Nadu.
 Solo Kuchipudi Recital in Veena Sheshanna Bhavana, Mysore
 Essence of Life in Chowdiah Memorial Hall, Bangalore
 Essence of Life at Vivanta by Taj, Hyderabad.
 Natya Mahotsav-Kittappa Pillai Centenary Celebrations, Ravindra Bhavan, Goa
 Pallaki Seva Prabandhamu(A Dance Opera), Narada Gana Sabha, Chennai
 Annual Dance Festival of Music Academy, Chennai
Nayika-Excellence Personified- A Kuchipudi & Bharathanatyam duet performance by Prateeksha Kashi with Rukmini Vijayakumar
 Feel India, a cultural extravaganca, The Ashok Amphitheatre, New Delhi
 Natya Vriksha Young Dancers Festival, Natya Vriksha in collaboration with UNESCO, Sangeet Natak Akademi and Ministry of Culture, celebrates World Dance Day
 Soorya Music and Dance Festival, Trivandrum, Kerala
 Nishagandhi Dance Festival 2016, Trivandrum, Kerala

Overseas performances and workshops

 US & Canada Tour for Kuchipudi Performances and Workshops
 Kuchipudi Faculty at Dance India-Milapfest 2014, Liverpool Hope University, Liverpool
 Mahotsav 2014, Bharathiya Vidhya Bhavan, London
 Festivals of India 2014 India-China Year of Friendly Exchange, China
 Sydney Dance Festival of Indian Classical Dances by Madhuram Academy of Performing Arts & Bharathiya Vidhya Bhavan, Australia.
 Dance India 2012 – Milap Festival – UK
 1st International Kannada Convention – USA 
 Music & Dance Festival - Italy

Major achievements

 Lead the Kuchipudi Dance Group tour to Africa sponsored by ICCR.
 One among the 100 Youth Delegates selected by Government of India as a part of India-China Year of Friendly Exchanges 2014
 Grade 'A' Artist of Doordarshan, (Broadcasting Media) Bangalore
 1st Rank in Junior Kuchipudi Dance Examination conducted by (Govt. of Karnataka)
 Worked as an assistant tutor at the Milap International Dance Summer School, UK
 Participated in the International Kuchipudi Convention, Hyderabad
 Played the lead role as Akkamahadevi in the telefilm " Hejje Guruthugalu"
 Playing the lead role as Mohini in a Kannada Serial "Kadambari Kanaja" telecasted in Udaya TV
 Released a Kuchipudi Dance DVD named "The Magic of Kuchipudi" aiming to spread the dance form widely.
 Acted in a Film "Prakruthi" which received NATIONAL AWARD FOR BEST ADAPTED SCREENPLAY

Awards and honors

Prateeksha Kashi recently got selected for Ustad Bismillah Khan Yuva Puraskar award by Central Sangeeth Natak Akademi, New Delhi. Prateeksha was honored with Aditya Vikram Birla Kalakiran Puraskar-2014 in the field of dance by the Government of Maharashtra. She was honored with the 37th annual Aryabhata International Award-2011 for excellence in Kuchipudi. She has the titles of Nalanda Nritya Nipuna, instituted by the renowned Nalanda Dance Research Centre and Nritya Jyoti, awarded at the Naveen Kalakar to her credits.

Apart from the above-mentioned awards she was the Winner of the Dance competition conducted by Pandit Jasraj's Foundation at New York and also Recipient of the scholarship from the Ministry of Culture, Govt of India
Prateeksha kashi Received "Young Dancer" award from Sanjali School of Odissi as a part of PRAVAHA 2013. In 2014, Ms. Kashi Received Kalabharathi National Young Talent Award/Kalabharathi Yuva Nrutha Pratibha Award, Naatyavedha Award 2014 as a part of "Jathis Music and Dance Festival"

Film, television and theatre

Prateeksha Kashi is going to play the female lead role in Priyamanasam, A Sanskrit Movie based on Malayalam Poet Unnayi Variyar. As per the news it is going to be the third Sanskrit movie being produced after 22 Years in India. Priyamanasam Movie got the honour to be the inaugural movie in the International Film Festival of India, Goa

Prateeksha also has the credit of being featured in many dance productions for the television media and is a graded artist of the Doordarshan Kendra. She is now dancing and playing prominent roles in almost all the dance dramas with her seniors for many national dance festivals. Prateeksha is an empanelled artist of ICCR, Govt. of India. She acted in a Kannada film Prakruthi which won the National Award for Adaptive Screenplay for the year 2013 and also special jury award in the Bangalore International Film Festival-2014

Hailed from such an artistic family prateeksha kashi showed her talent in acting as well. She played the lead role "Mohini" in a Kannada serial named Kaadambari Kanaja which is getting telecasted in Udaya TV(Kannada).

She acted in telefilms including Hejjegurthugalu, which features her in the lead role Akkamahadevi. Along with her Mother Vyjayanthi Kashi, she acted in Mathana - a confluence of Drama and Dance, which got good reviews on her acting.
Prateeksha Kashi acted in a short film series on social awareness named "Dwar"- Door For Transformation produced by KnowYourStar & Ravin Productions.

Productions
Shambhavi Dance Theatre produced a dance DVD "The Magic of Kuchipudi" featuring Prateeksha Kashi.The dance DVD got released by Padmabhushan Dr. Yamini Krishnamurthy as a part of "Nayika-Excellence Personified" which is organised on the occasion of Woman's Day on 8 March 2014 in Bharathiya Vidhya Bhavan, Bangalore. The Main Motto of producing this dance DVD is spreading of dance form kuchipudi as a Parampara to the younger generation, says Smt. Vyjayanthi Kashi, who is the artistic director of Shambhavi.

Prateeksha Kashi played the role of Madhavi, a courtesan in dance production "Cilapathikaram" for which she got laurels from critics.

"Essence of Life" is the brain child of Dega Deva Kumar Reddy, who is a producer of south Indian films and a follower of spiritual teacher Jiddu Krishnamurti Garu. In this production they want to spread the teachings of JK through the five different traditional art forms including kuchipudi with other four forms. Prateeksha Kashi has been chosen to choreograph and present the teachings of JK in this multimedia production "Essence of Life". She contributed in this creative work by choreographing and performing on a concept "Can We Live Without Problems". She performed recently in Music Academy, Chennai
 and also in Chowdiah Memorial Hall, Bangalore. Prateeksha Kashi recently gave her performance in Ravindra Bharathi, Hyderabad as a part of Essence of Life and DVD's and Audio CD's of this creative project got released.

Interviews
Dancing Daughter's - The Tribune India
World Mother's Day Special Interview - Times of India
Dancer Who Loves Acting - The Hindu
Kuchipudi Dancer Wins Birla Award- The New Indian Express
Dancing her Way to Films
Interview with OzIndian TV Show, Sydney, Australia
Interview with KnowYourStar -
Interview with "Deccan Chronicle" -
Interview with "The Hindu" - Bangalore Edition
Interview with "The Hindu" - Thiruvananthapuram, Kerala Edition
Interview with NewIndianExpress
Webindia123
Manipalblog.com/Virtually There V7

Reviews

Kashi has been discussed in 

 Inheritors of Tradition - The Hindu
 When Nishagandhi Bloomed - The Hindu
 Captivating Abhinaya - Times of India
 The Hindu-Display of skill and aesthetics
 Telegraph India 
 Narthaki.com
 Review - "Kinkini Utsav"
 Report - "Perfection redefined"
 The Hindu - "Immaculate presentation" 
 "Feats of grace, skill"

 Dance review
 Dance review
 Dance review
 Dance review 
 Deccan Herald
 An invocation to the divine.

 A Gift worth the waist given by her dancer mother
 A Pure Beginning-Sydney Dance Festival

References

External links 

Movies
 Prateeksha Kashi Art based Movie "Prakruthi"

Interviews
Interview with Oz Indian TV Show, Sydney, Australia
Interview with Sdhwaney, Sydney, Australia
Prateeksha Kashi interview in Essence of Life Press meet Bangalore
Prateeksha Kashi interview during EOL DVD Launch

The Magic of Kuchipudi- Dance DVD trailer
 The Magic of Kuchipudi, Trailer of Dance DVD

Awards
 Prateeksha Kashi Receiving Aryabhatta International Award
 Prateeksha Kashi Receiving Young Dancer's Award

Serial's & Shortfilms
 Prateeksha Kashi in Kaadambari Kanaja Serial, Udaya TV
 Aigiri Nandhini Performance in Udaya TV
 Western Dance by Prateeksha Kashi
 Ms.kashi Kadambari kanaja Team in Super Kutumba
 Super Kutumba, Udaya TV
 Prateeksha Kashi in Super Kutumba, Udaya TV
 Akkamahadevi Hejjeguruthugalu
 Dwar-Door for Transformation

Performance videos
 Prateeksha Kashi in Essence of Life Press meet in Tajvivanta, Hyderabad
Press meet of EOL team in Bangalore
 Essence of Life DVD Launch
 Kalabharathi National Young Dance Fest 2013, Thrissur, Kerala
 Rasa Sanje, ADA Rangamandira, Bangalore
 MAHA MAAYA, Ravindra Kalakshetra, Bangalore
 Tanisha Dance Festival,Kuchipudi Village, Andhrapradesh
 Nrityabharath Dance Festival,Ravindra Kalakshetra, Bangalore
 Music & Dance Feastival
 Kuchipudi Sambrama, Bangalore
 Bangalore Habba, Bangalore
 Kuchipudi Vaibhavam, Indiranagar Sangeetha Sabha, Bangalore
 Kuchipudi Recital, Natarani, Ahmedabad
 Ankur Dance Festival, Kolkata
 Kuchipudi Recital, Bangalore

Dance Workshops
 Kuchipudi Recital, New York
 Workshop & performance in Italy

Kuchipudi exponents
Year of birth missing (living people)
Artists from Bangalore
Living people
Indian female classical dancers
Performers of Indian classical dance
Indian television actresses
Actresses from Bangalore
Dancers from Karnataka
20th-century Indian dancers
20th-century Indian women artists
Women artists from Karnataka